Mayors for the Liberec Region (SLK) is a regionalist party in the Czech Republic that was established prior to the 2008 Czech regional elections. The party won the 2012 regional election in Liberec and its leader Martin Půta became governor of the Liberec Region, the first time a governor had come from outside one of the major parties. The SLK cooperates with the Mayors and Independents party.

Ideology
The party focuses on regional problems. It supports economical responsibility, transparency and flood repairs. SLK was critical of coalition between ČSSD and SOS that ruled the region in 2008-2012. SLK criticised coalition for corruption and slow repairment of roads damaged by floods.

History
SLK was established in 2008 and participated in regional election. The party received almost 14% but remained in opposition. SLK participated in 2010 legislative election. Its members were nominated by TOP 09. Member of SLK Jan Farský was elected member of parliament.

Martin Půta led SLK in 2012 regional election and won over 20% of votes. Půta became Governor of the region.

Půta led to party in 2016 election and won over 30% of votes.

Election results

Chamber of Deputies

Senate

Česká Lípa

Jablonec nad Nisou

Liberec

Regional assembly

References

Conservative parties in the Czech Republic
Regionalist parties in the Czech Republic
Political parties established in 2008
Liberec Region
2008 establishments in the Czech Republic